The Macau Museum of Art (MAM;) is an art museum in Sé, Macau, China.

History
The museum was established on 19 March 1999.

Architecture
The museum building spans over 10,192 m2 with 4,000 m2 of exhibition area. The Museum is a five-storey building with different types of exhibition areas: spaces for Chinese traditional art are located on the 4th floor; the collections of MAM are displayed on the 3rd floor; a large special gallery is on the 2nd floor.

Exhibitions
 Determined Spirit – Calligraphy and Painting of Fu Shen

See also
 List of museums in Macau

References

External links

 

1999 establishments in Macau
Museums established in 1999
Museums in Macau
Sé, Macau